Tempting Fate is a 2015 Nigerian American film written, directed and produced by Kevin Nwankwor. The film stars Ramsey Nouah, Dan Davies and John Vogel. It first premiered at the 2015 Pan African Film Festival and also at the USA Indie Fest.

Cast

References

External links
 Official Website
 

2015 films
Films set in the United States
English-language Nigerian films
Nigerian crime drama films
American crime drama films
2010s English-language films
2010s American films